(), meaning "Serbia to Tokyo", is a slogan and catchphrase dating back to the early 1990s. In 1991, Serbian (then-Yugoslav) football club Red Star Belgrade won the European Cup and the worldwide title in Tokyo, Japan, winning the Intercontinental Cup. This was the greatest success of any football club ever in Yugoslavia, and was much envied by the other nations at the time of increased ethnic tensions. The phrase has been used by Serbian football fans to taunt fans from rival ethnic groups in the beginning of the Yugoslav Wars of the 1990s.

The phrase is evoked by both Serbian nationalists, and Serbs jokingly mocking Serb exceptionalism alike.

Origin of the phrase
On 29 May 1991, as inter-ethnic relations in Yugoslavia were growing tenser, Red Star defeated French team Olympique de Marseille to win the European Cup – the first Yugoslav team to do so, and the second Eastern European. As the winners of the European Cup, Red Star Belgrade earned a place in the Intercontinental Cup, which was held at the Tokyo National Stadium. Exultant fans coined the phrase to glorify their team's upcoming adventure.

On 8 December 1991, Red Star won the Intercontinental Cup, defeating Chilean team Colo-Colo. By that time, the tension that had underlain the  European Cup match had ignited into the Yugoslav Wars, with a short-lived war in Slovenia, and a full-scale war in Croatia. In this context, the phrase's associations with Serbian victory made it particularly appealing to nationalists and militarists.

Occurrences

Graffiti containing the message are present in Serbia, as well in Republika Srpska and other parts of Bosnia and Herzegovina. Such graffiti was also seen in Kosovo during the Kosovo War. In the Kosovo village of Lozica in the Mališevo municipality, the local Albanian population was claiming that the graffiti "" was written by Serbian military forces during the destruction of the village.

During the NATO bombing of Yugoslavia, the phrase was expanded. "", meaning "Serbia to Tokyo, but over Milwaukee", in order to show disagreement with United States' role during the bombing. After the bombing ended, phrase extension was abandoned.

References in popular culture 
 Serbian alternative rock band Goribor released a demo album Stondom do Tokija (Stoned to Tokyo) as a parody for the slogan.

References

External links
 Article on the 2006 secession of Montenegro from Serbia, exploring how "Srbija do Tokija" is no longer applicable, at the International Herald Tribune
 Article on Serbian/Albanian conflicts in 1999, including the use of "Serbia to Tokyo" as a graffito, at the New York Times
 Review of Melanie Friend's No Place Like Home: Echoes from Kosovo, in which "Serbia to Tokyo" is compared to threats of rape and murder.

Graffiti and unauthorised signage
Serbian nationalism
Serbian political phrases
Slogans
Association football culture
Yugoslav culture